Rafael Cañedo Benítez (1 January 1942 – 10 July 2001) was a Mexican businessman and politician affiliated with the Institutional Revolutionary Party. He served as Senator of the LVIII and (briefly) the LIX Legislatures of the Mexican Congress representing Puebla and as Deputy of the LV Legislature.

He was the founder of Grupo HR, a group of radio stations in Puebla, that in 1988 got renamed to Grupo Acir Puebla.

References

1942 births
2001 deaths
People from Puebla (city)
20th-century Mexican businesspeople
Mexican company founders
Members of the Senate of the Republic (Mexico) for Puebla
Members of the Chamber of Deputies (Mexico) for Puebla
Institutional Revolutionary Party politicians
20th-century Mexican politicians
Deputies of the LV Legislature of Mexico
Senators of the LVIII and LIX Legislatures of Mexico